John Reva (born 23 September 1990) is a Papua New Guinean first-class cricketer. He made his first-class debut in the 2015–17 ICC Intercontinental Cup against the Netherlands on 16 June 2015. He made his List A debut in the 2015–17 ICC World Cricket League Championship on 22 June 2015, also against the Netherlands. He made his Twenty20 International debut for Papua New Guinea against Ireland in the 2015 ICC World Twenty20 Qualifier tournament on 15 July 2015. He made his One Day International (ODI) debut on 6 November 2016 against Hong Kong.

In August 2018, he was named in Papua New Guinea's squad for Group A of the 2018–19 ICC World Twenty20 East Asia-Pacific Qualifier tournament. In March 2019, he was named in Papua New Guinea's squad for the Regional Finals of the 2018–19 ICC World Twenty20 East Asia-Pacific Qualifier tournament. The following month, he was named in Papua New Guinea's squad for the 2019 ICC World Cricket League Division Two tournament in Namibia.

In September 2019, he was named in Papua New Guinea's squad for the 2019 ICC T20 World Cup Qualifier tournament in the United Arab Emirates.

References

External links
 

1990 births
Living people
Papua New Guinean cricketers
Papua New Guinean sportsmen
Papua New Guinea One Day International cricketers
Papua New Guinea Twenty20 International cricketers
People from the National Capital District (Papua New Guinea)